Born Again in the USA is the second and final studio album by Loose Fur. The album was released on March 21, 2006.

Track listing
 "Hey Chicken" – 3:02
 "The Ruling Class" – 3:35
 "Answers to Your Questions" – 4:58
 "Apostolic" – 2:48
 "Stupid as the Sun" – 2:33
 "Pretty Sparks" – 3:12
 "An Ecumenical Matter" – 3:20
 "Thou Shalt Wilt" – 2:47
 "Wreckroom" – 8:36
 "Wanted" – 3:00

References

Loose Fur albums
2006 albums
Drag City (record label) albums